Baribour ( "Abundance") is a district (srok) in the north of Kampong Chhnang province, in central  Cambodia. The district capital is Baribour town located around 38 kilometres north west of the provincial capital of Kampong Chhnang by road. The district shares a border with Pursat province to the west and with Kampong Thom province to the north. The district borders on the Tonle Sap and the Tonle Sap river forms the northern and eastern borders of the district.

The district is easily accessed by road from Kampong Chhnang (38 km) Pursat (55 km) and Phnom Penh (129 km). Baribour district is one of the smallest districts in Kampong Chhnang province by land area and only Chol Kiri district is smaller. However, it has an average district population for the province due to the Tonle Sap and the National Highway. National Highway 5 which begins in Phnom Penh and ends at Poipet bisects the district running from north west to south east. National road 52 begins at the highway at Ponley and runs north to the port of Kampong Preah.

Location 
Baribour district lies in the north of the province and shares a border with Pursat and Kampong Thom provinces. Reading from the north clockwise, Baribour borders with Stoung district of Kampong Thom to the north. The eastern border of the district is shared with Kampong Leaeng district.

Administration 
The district is subdivided into 11 communes (khum) and 64 villages (phum).

References 

Districts of Kampong Chhnang province